Tikitiki is a small town in Waiapu Valley on the north bank of the Waiapu River in the Gisborne Region of the North Island of New Zealand. The area in which the town resides was formerly known as Kahukura. The name of the town comes from the full name of Māui, Māui-tikitiki-a-Taranga (Māui wrapped in the topknot of Taranga). State Highway 35 passes through the town at the easternmost point of the New Zealand state highway network.

These towns historically had a racecourse, four rugby teams, and several shops fuelled by a thriving dairy industry. In the 1950s and 1960s the towns had a combined population of 6,000, but economic downturn in the area in the mid to late 1960s led to urban drift, and 2011 figures put the population of both towns at 528. 95% of the towns' inhabitants identify as Māori. Most people in these towns are either homemakers, or employed in the roading, forestry, farming, or food industries, or as office workers.

Landmarks

According to Te Ara - the Encyclopedia of New Zealand "Tikitiki’s jewel" is St. Mary's church. It is non-denominational but has historic links to the Anglican Church and is therefore essentially an Anglican. Built from 1924 to 1926 under the guidance of Sir Āpirana Ngata to remember the Ngāti Porou soldiers who fought and died in World War I, and to commemorate the establishment of Christianity in Waiapu Valley and the East Coast. The church, which integrates Māori architecture into its design, contains references to the fallen soldiers within its extensive carvings, tukutuku, and stained glass windows. St Mary's church is of great spiritual and historical significance to Ngāti Porou, and is classified as a Category I Historic Place by Heritage New Zealand.

Above and behind the church is a hill containing the remains of a fortified pā called Pukemaire. The pā dates back to pre-European times, and by 1865 was occupied by followers of the syncretic Christian Māori religion, Pai Mārire. That year, as part of the New Zealand Wars, the pā was attacked by both colonial forces and Ngāti Porou forces loyal to the New Zealand Government (called kūpapa). This was one of the last confrontations between Pai Mārire and Ngāti Porou. While the majority of the area inside the pā's defensive perimeter has been ploughed many times, the eastern end behind St Mary's Church has been left intact, where the remains of kūmara storage pits can be seen.

Marae

The Tikitiki area has five marae belonging to Ngāti Porou hapū.

Kaiwaka Marae and Te Kapenga meeting house is a meeting place of Ngāti Putaanga and Te Whānau a Hinerupe. In October 2020, the Government committed $5,756,639 from the Provincial Growth Fund to upgrade the marae and 28 others in the Gisborne District; the funding was expected to create 205 jobs.

Rahui Marae and Rongomaianiwaniwa meeting house is a meeting place of Te Whānau a Hinerupe and Te Whānau a Rākaimataura. Tinātoka Marae and Te Poho o Tinatoka meeting house is a meeting place of Te Whānau a Te Uruahi and Te Whanau a Tinatoka. In October 2020, the Government committed $1,686,254 from the Provincial Growth Fund to upgrade Rahui Marae, Tinātoka Marae and 4 other Rongowhakaata marae, creating an estimated 41 jobs.

Putaanga Marae and meeting house is a meeting place of Ngāti Putaanga.

Taumata o Tapuhi Marae and Te Ao Kairau meeting house, a meeting place of Te Whānau a Tapuhi.

The Rangitukia area also has three marae.

Education

Tikitiki has a co-educational full primary school called Tikitiki School or Pae-O-Te-Riri School. The name Pae-O-Te-Riri means "Resting place of a war party on the march".

The school was opened in 1887 as a Māori school, and originally had approximately 300 students. This number has dropped substantially, and in May 2012, the school roll stood at 27 students. In 2019, it was a decile 1 school with a roll of 35.

References

External links
 Waiapu River valley article, with a section about Tikitiki, in Te Ara - the Encyclopedia of New Zealand
 Photos of St Mary’s church in Te Ara - the Encyclopedia of New Zealand
 St Mary’s church in the Heritage New Zealand register
 Aerial photograph of Pukemarie Pā published in 1994
 Tikitiki School website

Populated places in the Gisborne District